Sir David Bowes-Lyon KCVO (2 May 1902 – 13 September 1961) was the sixth son and last child of Claude Bowes-Lyon, 14th Earl of Strathmore and Kinghorne, and Cecilia Nina Cavendish-Bentinck, as well as their tenth and youngest child. His elder sister Lady Elizabeth Bowes-Lyon married Prince Albert, Duke of York (the future King George VI) the second son of King George V, in 1923 and became Queen Consort of the United Kingdom after the abdication of her husband's elder brother Edward VIII on 11 December 1936.

Marriage and issue
On 6 February 1929, he married Rachel Pauline Spender-Clay (19 January 1907 – 21 January 1996), younger daughter of Herbert Henry Spender-Clay, they had two children:
 Davina Katherine Bowes-Lyon (2 May 1930 – 1 November 2017); married on 14 January 1960 John Aymer Dalrymple, Viscount Dalrymple, later 13th Earl of Stair (9 October 1906 – 26 February 1996).
 Sir Simon Alexander Bowes-Lyon (born 17 June 1932); married Caroline Mary Viktoria Pike (born 27 September 1940) on 11 April 1966

Later life

During World War II, Bowes-Lyon was a member of the secret propaganda department Political Warfare Executive. He was High Sheriff of Hertfordshire in 1950 and Lord Lieutenant of Hertfordshire from 1 July 1952 until his death.

On 15 December 1948, Bowes-Lyon attended the christening of his grand nephew, Prince Charles.  He was one of eight sponsors/godparents of the prince, along with King George VI, King Haakon VII of Norway, Queen Mary, Princess Margaret, the Dowager Marchioness of Millford Haven, Patricia, Lady Brabourne, and Prince George of Greece and Denmark. 

As a keen gardener, he was awarded the Victoria Medal of Honour in 1953 and served as president of the Royal Horticultural Society from 1953 to 1961. In 1960, he commanded the third World Orchid Conference.

He was made a Knight Commander of the Royal Victorian Order in the 1959 Birthday Honours.

Death
He died at his sister's home, Birkhall, on the Balmoral estate, of a heart attack after suffering from hemiplegia on 13 September 1961, aged 59. The Queen Mother discovered him dead in bed. The funeral was held at Ballater, and he was buried at St Paul's Walden Bury.

His widow died thirty-four years later on 21 January 1996, aged 89.

Ancestry

References

1902 births
1961 deaths
Younger sons of earls
People educated at Eton College
Alumni of Magdalen College, Oxford
David Bowes-Lyon
Hertfordshire Regiment officers
High Sheriffs of Hertfordshire
Knights Commander of the Royal Victorian Order
Lord-Lieutenants of Hertfordshire
Victoria Medal of Honour recipients
David